The Chapel Hill Historic District is a national historic district in Cumberland, Allegany County, Maryland.  It is a mixed-use historic district of 810 contributing resources on  located on the southeast side of Cumberland. It contains a mix of residential, commercial, and institutional buildings, with St. Mary's Roman Catholic Church on the highest point.  The vast majority of the buildings were built between 1900 and 1910, and includes an extraordinary collection of double houses built for the industrial working class of the city.

It was listed on the National Register of Historic Places in 2005.

References

External links
, including photo in 1978, at Maryland Historical Trust
Boundary Map of the Chapel Hill Historic District, Allegany County, at Maryland Historical Trust

Historic districts on the National Register of Historic Places in Maryland
Historic districts in Allegany County, Maryland
Cumberland, Maryland
Working-class culture in Maryland
National Register of Historic Places in Allegany County, Maryland